Francis Joseph O'Keefe (24 April 1898 – 26 June 1958) was an Australian rules footballer who played with Fitzroy in the Victorian Football League (VFL).

Notes

External links 

1898 births
1958 deaths
Australian rules footballers from Victoria (Australia)
Fitzroy Football Club players